Info Institute of Engineering (IIE) is a private engineering educational Institute, located in Kovilpalayam, Coimbatore, Tamil Nadu, India. The college is approved by the All India Council for Technical Education (AICTE)] and is affiliated with Anna University of Technology, Coimbatore. The college was established in 2007. The institute has signed MoUs with local industries for job training.

Departments 
 Department of Civil Engineering
 Department of Mechanical Engineering
 Department of Electronics and Communication Engineering
 Department of Computer Science and Engineering
 Department of Information Technology
 Department of Electrical and Electronic Engineering
 Department of Management Studies 
 Department of Computer Applications
 Department of Science & Humanities

Courses offered 
Under Graduate Programmes:
 B.E. – Civil Engineering
 B.E. – Computer Science & Engineering
 B.E. – Electronics & Communication Engineering 
 B.E. – Electrical & Electronics Engineering
 B.Tech. –Information Technology
 B.E. – Mechanical Engineering

Post Graduate Programmes:
 MCA – Master of Computer Applications 
 MBA – Master of Business Administration
 M.E. - Computer Science & Engineering
 M.E. - VLSI Design
 M.E. - Power Electronics & Drives
 M.E. - Communication Systems

Research Programmes:
 Ph.D. - Computer  Science & Engineering 
 Ph.D. - Electronics & Communication Engineering

References

External links 
 
 Convocation 2012 coverage in local Tamil newspapers

Engineering colleges in Tamil Nadu
Colleges affiliated to Anna University
Education in Coimbatore district
Educational institutions established in 2007
2007 establishments in Tamil Nadu